Marius Copil and Adrian Ungur were the defending champions, but lost in the first round to Chris Guccione and André Sá.
Florin Mergea and Horia Tecău won the title, defeating Guccione and Sá in the final, 7–5, 6–4.

Seeds

Draw

Draw

References
 Main Draw

Romanian Open